Pristimantis melanoproctus is a species of frog in the family Strabomantidae.

It is found in Venezuela and possibly Colombia. Its natural habitat is tropical dry forests. It is threatened by habitat loss.

Sources

melanoproctus
Endemic fauna of Venezuela
Amphibians of Venezuela
Amphibians described in 1984
Taxonomy articles created by Polbot